Naziru M Ahmad also known as Sarkin Waka (born 4 September 1986) is a Nigerian singer and songwriter. Naziru was turbaned as Sarkin Wakan Sarkin Kano (Chief Singer of the Emir of Kano) in December 2018.

An expert musician per excellence with specialization in Royalty who in 2022 released a new music "Sai mun￼ Bata Wuta".

Discography

Studio albums
Ahmad sings more than 300 songs.

Career
Ahmad has spoken of his love for Hausa music icons like Mamman Shata, and Dankwairo. "To be candid, I can't specifically say what attracted my soul to music, but I had nurtured a dream of being a musician since I was seven. I started singing when there was no music studio in Kano. I would sing in front of gatherings and even as then I was applauded and celebrated. I went fully into music in 2000."

References

Living people
Nigerian singer-songwriters
Hausa-language singers
Musicians from Kano
1986 births